The High Falls are a waterfall on the Genesee River in the city of Rochester, New York. The High Falls area was the site of much of Rochester's early industrial development, where industry was powered by falling water. Brown's Race diverts water from above the falls and was used to feed various flour mills and industries; today the water is used to produce hydroelectric power.

The High Falls may be viewed from the Pont De Rennes bridge, a pedestrian bridge that spans the Genesee River a few hundred feet from the base of the falls.

The High Falls were the site of the final jump of "The Yankee Leaper" Sam Patch who died after jumping off of the High Falls in 1829.

An abstract representation of the High Falls is used on the logo of Rochester New York FC as a symbol of the city.

References

Waterfalls of New York (state)
New York (state) populated places on the Genesee River
Geography of Rochester, New York
Tourist attractions in Rochester, New York
Block waterfalls
Landforms of Monroe County, New York